Falcon Express Cargo Airlines was a cargo airline based in Dubai, United Arab Emirates. It was established in 1995 and operates express parcel services throughout the Persian Gulf, mainly for FedEx, UPS, TNT and Aramex. It also operated scheduled chartered cargo operations for DHL between Bahrain and Jeddah. Its main base was Dubai International Airport.

Destinations 
Falcon Express Cargo Airlines operated freight services to the following international scheduled destinations (February 2010): Dubai, Bahrain, Doha, Jeddah, Riyadh, Kuwait, Salalah. Falcon Express Cargo Airlines ceased operations in September 2012.

Fleet 

The Falcon Express Cargo Airlines fleet includes the following aircraft (February 2010):

2 Fokker F27 Mk500,
5 Raytheon Beech 1900C Airliners

References

Defunct airlines of the United Arab Emirates
Airlines established in 1995
Airlines disestablished in 2012
Defunct cargo airlines
Cargo airlines of the United Arab Emirates
2012 disestablishments in the United Arab Emirates
Emirati companies established in 1995